The WBSC Premier12 is the international baseball tournament organized by the World Baseball Softball Confederation (WBSC), featuring the 12 highest-ranked national baseball teams in the world. The first tournament was held by Taiwan and Japan in November 2015. The second tournament, 2019 WBSC Premier12, was held in November 2019, and served as a qualifier for two teams for baseball at the 2020 Summer Olympics.

Overview
From 1938 to 2011, the International Baseball Federation (IBAF), then the governing body of baseball, considered the Baseball World Cup to be the sport's major world championship. Following the 2011 version of the event, the IBAF chose to discontinue the tournament in favor of the World Baseball Classic.

In 2005 the International Olympic Committee (IOC) announced that baseball and softball would be removed from the Summer Olympics beginning in 2012. Thereafter, the IOC also officially reclassified baseball and softball as two different disciplines of the same sport. In 2013, the IBAF merged with the International Softball Federation to create the World Baseball Softball Confederation (WBSC).

On 27 November 2014, the WBSC announced the creation of the Premier12 tournament, calling it "the new flagship pro baseball nations championship," which would be held every four years. It was viewed as a event to fill-in the calendar in place of the Baseball World Cup, since the World Baseball Classic took its place and an attempt to boost baseball's bid for inclusion in the 2020 Summer Olympics in Tokyo. The WBSC proposed that, if baseball did return to the Olympics for 2020, the 2019 WBSC Premier12 be used as a qualifying tournament.

Participants

The field of the tournament consists of the 12 best national teams in the world according to the most recent WBSC World Rankings.

Results

Medal table

Theme music 
 Heroic Charge (Bryce Jacobs)

See also

World Baseball Classic
Women's Baseball World Cup
Women's Softball World Cup
Baseball at the Summer Olympics

References

External links
IBAF Congress approves new Format of International Tournaments Official IBAF Website
‘Premier12’ Elite Baseball World Championship to be Launched in 2015 Official IBAF Website
Mundial de Béisbol Premier 12 Resultado de los juegos y estadísticas.

 
Premier 12
Quadrennial sporting events
Recurring sporting events established in 2015
Premier12